Koshelev is a Russian masculine surname, its feminine counterpart is Kosheleva. It may refer to:

Alexander Koshelev (1806—1883), Russian journalist and state official.
Georgi Koshelev, Soviet production designer and set decorator
Leonid Koshelev (born 1979), Russian-Uzbekistani football player
Nikolay Koshelev (1840–1918), Russian painter
Semyon Koshelev (born 1996), Kazakhstani ice hockey player
Sergei Koshelev (born 1987), Russian football player
Tatiana Kosheleva (born 1988), Russian volleyball player
Vasile Coșelev (born 1972), Moldovan football player
Vladimir Koshelev (born 1974), Russian politician

See also
Koshelev (volcano), a stratovolcano in Russia

Russian-language surnames